Erica Schultz is an American comic book writer, letterer, and editor. She is best known for writing the 2018 Daredevil Annual for comic book publisher Marvel, her urban fantasy series Forgotten Home with ComiXology Originals, participation in DC Comics' first Writers Workshop, and her creator-owned crime series, M3.

Career
Schultz worked as an art director at an advertising agency in New York City, and then started working at Neal Adams' Continuity Studios. Originally she was an animator on Marvel's Astonishing X-Men motion comic, but continued doing art and design work, including inking and coloring on books such as Batman: Odyssey, The First X-Men, The Coming of the Supermen, and Blood.

In 2010/2011, Schultz co-created the Vices Press crime series M3, with Vicente Alcázar. It won the 2012 award for Best Comic Book at the Burbank International Film Festival.

In 2014, Schultz scripted Revenge: The Secret Origin of Emily Thorne, Marvel's Original Graphic Novel based on ABC's Revenge, in collaboration with TV series writer Ted Sullivan.

In 2015, Schultz was chosen by Gail Simone as one of the many female writers to be involved with Dynamite Entertainment's Swords of Sorrow crossover series. Schultz wrote the Swords of Sorrow: Black Sparrow & Lady Zorro One-Shot and also co-wrote the Swords of Sorrow: Masquerade & Kato One-Shot with G. Willow Wilson. Schultz also wrote a story titled "Pop Goes the World" for the Vertigo Comics anthology Vertigo Quarterly: SFX #1.

In 2016, Schultz participated in the first DC Writers Workshop class taught by Scott Snyder. She was also published in DC Comics' New Talent Showcase #1 for her Hawkgirl story with artist Sonny Liew.

In December 2016, Dynamite Entertainment announced Schultz, along with artist Maria Sanapo, would be relaunching the Charmed  comic book series, based on the television show that ran from 1998 to 2006.

In addition to the release of Schultz's Charmed: A Thousand Deaths in 2017, she was also announced as editor of Tee Franklin's Bingo Love graphic novel  published by Image Comics  and as a contributing writer to Space Between Entertainment's Destiny, NY Volume 2. 

In March 2018, Schultz was announced as a contributor to Image Comics' Where We Live Las Vegas Shooting Benefit Anthology, and in April, Action Lab Comics announced that Schultz's Twelve Devils Dancing comic series with artist Dave Acosta would premiere under their Action Lab/Danger Zone imprint. In May 2018, Schultz was announced as the new writer for Dynamite Entertainment's Xena: Warrior Princess beginning with issue #6 and as the writer for Marvel's 2018 Daredevil Annual.

In April 2019, Schultz was announced as lettering instructor for Comics Experience, and in August, Schultz was announced as a writing and storytelling teacher for the Kubert School. Schultz's story, "Future Shocks: The Switch" was included in 2000 AD Prog 2145, published in August 2019. In October, ComiXology announced Schultz's mini-series Forgotten Home would be exclusive to the platform's ComiXology Originals digital comic books. Forgotten Home has since gone on to be nominated for five 2020 Ringo Awards including Best Writer (Schultz), Best Inker (Marika Cresta), Best Cover Artist (Natasha Alterici), Best Letterer (Cardinal Rae), and Best Series.

In February 2020, Schultz was announced as an editor for Mad Cave Studios. In May 2021, Schultz launched a Kickstarter campaign to fund an original graphic novel titled The Deadliest Bouquet. Near the end of 2021, Aftershock Comics announced a new series for 2022 titled Bylines in Blood co-written by Schultz and Van Jensen. Then in December 2021, Marvel provided a free digital comic book in collaboration with Citizen titled The Power of Light written by Schultz.

In May 2022, Image Comics announced that The Deadliest Bouquet would be re-released as monthly issues published by Image in August.   In July, Marvel released Moon Knight Black, White & Blood #3 featuring Schultz's short story "Wrong Turn" focused on Jake Lockley,  illustrated by artist David Lopez.  During the 2022 New York Comic Con, Marvel revealed that Schultz would write a 5-issue miniseries, X-23: Deadly Regenesis as well as a new miniseries called Hallows' Eve, with both comic books to release in March 2023. 

Schultz has also served as a letterer on multiple comic books, including Neal Adams' "Batman Zombie" in DC's Batman: Black and White #1, Alan Moore's "Big Nemo" and Garth Ennis' "Red Horse" for Electricomics, and she lettered the entire Swords of Sorrow series. Schultz lettered Dynamite's Red Sonja, Dejah Thoris, and Vampirella titles in 2016.

Bibliography (Writing Credits)
M3 (#1-#12) (Vices Press, 2011) - M3 #1 won Best Comic for the 2012 Burbank International Film Festival - 
Odyssey Presents: Valkyrie vs. Venus #1 (TidalWave Productions, 2012)
Revenge: The Secret Origin of Emily Thorne (Marvel, 2014) - Co-writer with Ted Sullivan
The Unauthorized Biography of Winston Churchill: A Documentary (Vices Press, 2014)
Rise #2 "Brothers In Arms" (Northwest Press, 2015)
Vertigo Quarterly: SFX #1 "Pop Goes The World" (Vertigo/DC, 2015)
Swords of Sorrow: Masquerade & Kato (Dynamite Entertainment, 2015) - Co-writer with G. Willow Wilson
Swords of Sorrow: Black Sparrow & Lady Zorro (Dynamite Entertainment, 2015)
Cheese: A Love Story (Vices Press, 2015)
The 27 Club: A Comics Anthology "A Seminal Vintage" (Action Lab Entertainment and Red Stylo Media, 2015) - Nominated for a 2016 Harvey Award for Best Anthology
Swords of Sorrow: The Complete Saga TPB (Dynamite Entertainment, 2016)
Aw Yeah Comic! #12 "Boss Appreciation Day" (Aw Yeah Comics! 2016)
New Talent Showcase #1 "Hawkgirl: Weapons of War" (DC Comics, 2016)
Charmed: A Thousand Deaths (#1-#5 & TPB) (Dynamite Entertainment, 2017)
Where We Live: A Benefit for the Survivors in Las Vegas "Daddy's Little Girl" (Image Comics, 2018) - Winner for the 2019 Ringo Award for Best Anthology
Oneshi Press Quarterly Anthology #4 "Heartbreaker" (Oneshi Press, 2018)
Oneshi Press Quarterly Anthology #5 "Gabrielle" (Oneshi Press, 2018)
Twelve Devils Dancing (#1-#6) (Action Lab Danger Zone, 2018)
Xena: Warrior Princess Vol. 2 (Dynamite Entertainment, 2018)
Daredevil Annual (Marvel, 2018)
Corpus: A Comic Anthology of Bodily Ailments "This is How it Feels" (Corpus, 2018)
Destiny, NY Vol. 2 "Sister, Sister" (Space Between Entertainment, 2018)
This Nightmare Kills Fascists "Bishop Takes Rook; Knight Takes Pawn" (A Wave Blue World, 2018)
Twelve Devils Dancing TPB (Action Lab Danger Zone, 2019)
The Good Fight "Long Overdue" (Adam Ferris Productions, 2019)
Marvel Universe: Time and Again TPB (Marvel, 2019)
2000 AD Prog 2145 "Future Shock: The Switch" (2000 AD, 2019)
Bettie Page Halloween Special "War of the Worlds" (Dynamite Entertainment, 2019)
Strange Tails (Vices Press, 2019) - Nominated for a 2020 Ringo Award for Best Anthology
Forgotten Home (Vices Press, comiXology Originals, 2019) - Nominated for five 2020 Ringo Awards for Best Writer, Best Inker, Best Cover Artist, Best Letterer, and Best Series
The Silver Spurs of Oz (Capstone Publishing, 2020)
Aw Yeah Comics! #14 "All The World's A Stage" (Aw Yeah Comics! 2020)
Maybe Someday "Ghost in the Apartment" (A Wave Blue World 2020) - Nominated for a 2021 Ringo Award for Best Anthology
Legacy of Mandrake (Red 5 Comics, Stonebot Comics, King Features, 2020)
The Deadliest Bouquet (Vices Press, 2021; Image Comics, 2022)
The Power of Light  (Marvel, 2021)
Bylines In Blood  (AfterShock, 2022) - Co-writer with Van Jensen
Moon Knight: Black, White, and Blood (Marvel, 2022)

References

External links
Interview with Erica Schultz on Marvel's "The Watcher"
San Diego Comic-Con 2014 Women of Marvel panel podcast.
PREVIEWSworld "Women In Comics" month interview from March 2015
7 Reasons We Need More HAWKGIRL by Erica Schultz and Sonny Liew
NYCC ’22: The WOMEN OF MARVEL return to the Big Apple with new titles!

Female comics writers
American comics writers
Living people
1977 births